James Disney-May (born 4 August 1992) is an English competitive swimmer.

He has represented Great Britain in the Olympic Games, and competed for England in the Commonwealth Games.  At the 2012 Summer Olympics in London, he swam for the British team in the men's 4×100-metre freestyle relay.

Personal life
Disney-May attended Millfield School from 2005 to 2010.

In December 2022 Disney-May was sentenced to 21 months in jail with 18 months suspended after pleading guilty to domestic assault against his partner. He was also told to attend counseling sessions, be electronically tracked for four months and had a four year restraining order banning him from contacting his partner and her parents.

References

1992 births
Living people
Auburn Tigers men's swimmers
British male swimmers
Commonwealth Games bronze medallists for England
Olympic swimmers of Great Britain
Swimmers at the 2012 Summer Olympics
Swimmers at the 2014 Commonwealth Games
Commonwealth Games medallists in swimming
Sportspeople from Chertsey
British male freestyle swimmers
People educated at Millfield
English people convicted of assault
Medallists at the 2014 Commonwealth Games